Jukka Olavi Toivola (7 September 1949 – 27 May 2011) was a male long-distance runner and teacher of chemistry from Finland.

Born in Liperi, North Karelia, Toivola represented his native country at the 1976 Summer Olympics in the men's marathon, finishing in 27th place. In 1979, he won the first edition of the Stockholm Marathon.

Toivola died in 2011 in Pori, after suffering from ALS since 2007.

Achievements

References

External links

1949 births
2011 deaths
People from Liperi
Finnish male long-distance runners
Finnish male marathon runners
Athletes (track and field) at the 1976 Summer Olympics
Olympic athletes of Finland
Neurological disease deaths in Finland
Deaths from motor neuron disease
Sportspeople from North Karelia